Daniel Hobbins is a professor of history at the University of Notre Dame and an American historian specializing in medieval France.  He is the recipient of the Nina Maria Gorrissen Prize and Fellow at the American Academy in Berlin for Fall 2011.

Life 
Hobbins' best-known work is The Trial of Joan of Arc, which includes the first new translation of the transcripts of Joan of Arc's trial for fifty years. He gave guest lectures on Joan of Arc at Bowling Green State University and Ohio Northern University in October 2007.

He has also written in The American Historical Review on Jean Gerson.

See also
Joan of Arc bibliography

References

Further reading
Hobbins, Daniel.  American Historical Review 109.2 (April, 2004): 681-681.
Maier, Wendy A. History: Reviews of New Books 34.256 (Winter, 2006): 56-56.
Tiefenbrun, Susan.  "Why the Medieval Trial of Joan of Arc is of Particular Interest Today" in Journal of Law & Religion 21.2 (2005/2006): 469–473.

External links
OSU Department of History - Daniel Hobbins
Review of The Trial of Joan of Arc

Ohio State University faculty
Year of birth missing (living people)
Living people
21st-century American historians
21st-century American male writers
American male non-fiction writers